The Yichun Luming mine is a Chinese molybdenum mine located  south-west of the city of Yichun in Heilongjiang province. The mine is operated by Yichun Luming Mining Company, a subsidiary of China Railway Group. It is the largest open-pit mine in China. On 28 March 2020, the mine had a significant tailings release from its storage facility of 2.53 million cubic metres of polluted water. The Chinese government has launched an investigation into the incident.

See also
List of molybdenum mines
List of mines in China
Tailings

References

Molybdenum mines in China
Floods in China